Nikolaos Mitrou (born 10 July 1984) is a Greek former professional footballer who played as a midfielder.

Career
Born in Chalcis, Mitrou began his playing career by signing with Panionios F.C. in August 2002. He made 32 appearances in the Greek Super League for the club. He also played for Niki Volou, Digenis Akritas Morphou, Ethnikos Asteras, Lamia F.C., Aias Salamina F.C., Kastoria, Pierikos F.C.,Enosi Mideas F.C.,Poros F.C. and FC Zenit Čáslav.

References

External links
 
Myplayer.gr Profile
Profile at Onsports.gr

1984 births
Living people
Greek footballers
Greek expatriate footballers
Super League Greece players
Cypriot First Division players
Panionios F.C. players
Niki Volos F.C. players
Digenis Akritas Morphou FC players
Ethnikos Asteras F.C. players
PAS Lamia 1964 players
Aias Salamina F.C. players
Kastoria F.C. players
Pierikos F.C. players
FK Čáslav players
Paniliakos F.C. players
A.O. Glyfada players
Hersonissos F.C. players
Irodotos FC players
Nafpaktiakos Asteras F.C. players
Footballers at the 2004 Summer Olympics
Olympic footballers of Greece
Expatriate footballers in Cyprus
Expatriate footballers in the Czech Republic
Association football midfielders
Footballers from Chalcis